The 2011 PDC Pro Tour was a series of non-televised darts tournaments organised by the Professional Darts Corporation (PDC). They were the Professional Dart Players Association (PDPA) Players Championships and the UK Open Qualifiers.  This year there were 39 PDC Pro Tour events – 31 Players Championships and 8 UK Open Qualifiers.

Prize money
Prize money for each Players Championship and UK Open Qualifier increased from £31,200 in 2010 to £34,600 in 2011.

In addition, £400 per Pro Tour event was reserved for a nine-dart finish. Should this not be won in an event, it was carried over to the next event, and so on until a nine-dart finish was achieved. Once the prize fund was won, it reverted to £400 for the next event.

PDC Pro Tour Card
From 2011, the PDC Pro Tour operates a Tour Card system. 128 players are granted Tour Cards, which enables them to participate in all Players Championships and UK Open Qualifiers.

Tour cards 
The 2011 Tour Cards were awarded to:
101 players from the PDC Order of Merit after the 2011 World Championship
2 finalists from the 2010 PDC Women's World Championship
25 qualifiers from a four-day Qualifying School in Wigan (4 semi-finalists from each day, plus the top 9 players from the Q School Order of Merit)

Tour Cards were also offered to the four semi-finalists from the 2011 BDO World Championship, although none of the players took up the offer.

Q School

The PDC Pro Tour Qualifying School took place at the Robin Park Tennis Centre in Wigan from January 13–16.

A Q School Order of Merit was also created by using the following points system:

To complete the field of 128 Tour Card Holders, places were allocated down the final Qualifying School Order of Merit. The following players picked up Tour Cards as a result:

Players Championships
(All matches – best of 11 legs)

PDPA Players Championship 1 Halle at the Gerry Weber Centre, Halle on January 29

PDPA Players Championship 2 Halle at the Gerry Weber Centre, Halle on January 30

PDPA Players Championship 3 Derby at the Moorways Centre, Derby on February 19

PDPA Players Championship 4 Derby at the Moorways Centre, Derby on February 20

PDPA Players Championship 5 Crawley at the K2 Centre, Crawley on March 26

PDPA Players Championship 6 Crawley at the K2 Centre, Crawley on March 27

Austrian Open Players Championship 7 at Wiener Neustadt, Vienna on May 14

Austrian Open Players Championship 8 at Wiener Neustadt, Vienna on May 15

PDPA Players Championship 9 Crawley at the K2 Centre, Crawley on May 21

PDPA Players Championship 10 Crawley at the K2 Centre, Crawley on May 22

Eddie Cox Memorial Players Championship 11 at the Metrodome, Barnsley on June 11

Bobby Bourn Memorial Players Championship 12 at the Metrodome, Barnsley on June 12

Dutch Darts Trophy Players Championship 13 at Nuland, Netherlands on June 18

Dutch Darts Trophy Players Championship 14 at Nuland, Netherlands on June 19

London Ontario Players Championships 15 at Ontario, Canada on August 27

Canadian Masters Players Championships 16 at Ontario, Canada on August 28

PDPA Players Championships 17 Derby at the Moorways Centre, Derby on September 3

PDPA Players Championships 18 Derby at the Moorways Centre, Derby on September 4

PDPA Players Championships 19 Nuland at Nuland, Netherlands on September 24

PDPA Players Championships 20 Nuland at Nuland, Netherlands on September 25

PDPA Players Championships 21 Ireland at the New Citywest Convention Centre, Dublin on October 1

PDPA Players Championships 22 Ireland at the New Citywest Convention Centre, Dublin on October 2

John McEvoy Gold Dart Classic Players Championship 23 at the National Event Centre, Killarney on October 16

German Darts Classic Players Championship 24 at the Van Der Valk Hotel, Gladbeck on October 22

German Darts Classic Players Championship 25 at the Van Der Valk Hotel, Gladbeck on October 23

Spanish Darts Trophy Players Championship 26 at the Hotel Melia Benidorm, Alicante on October 29

Spanish Darts Trophy Players Championship 27 at the Hotel Melia Benidorm, Alicante on October 30

PDPA Players Championships 28 Crawley at the K2 Centre, Crawley on November 5

PDPA Players Championships 29 Crawley at the K2 Centre, Crawley on November 6

PDPA Players Championships 30 Wigan at the Robin Park Tennis Centre, Wigan on November 26

PDPA Players Championships 31 Wigan at the Robin Park Tennis Centre, Wigan on November 27

PDC Youth Tour
In 2011, the PDC established the PDC Unicorn Youth Tour – a series of 15 events open to players aged between 14 and 21. The top 28 players from the Youth Tour Order of Merit qualified for the 2012 PDC World Youth Championship.

UK Open Qualifiers

Australian Grand Prix Pro Tour

The Australian Grand Prix rankings are calculated from events across Australia. The top player in the rankings automatically qualifies for the 2012 World Championship.

Other PDC tournaments
The PDC also held a number of other tournaments during 2011. These were mainly smaller events with low prize money, and some had eligibility restrictions. All of these tournaments were non-ranking.

References

External links
2011 PDC Calendar

PDC Pro Tour
PDC Pro Tour